The Maisin are an indigenous people of Oro Province in Papua New Guinea. Most of the population of 3000 live in villages clustered along the southwestern shores of Collingwood Bay with an outlier (Uwe) on Cape Nelson. Far from roads and markets, villagers subsist mainly from the land and sea, making extensive use of rain forest for swidden (slash and burn) gardens, hunting and materials for houses and canoes. Despite the 'traditional' appearance of villages, however, the Maisin have long been integrated into the larger Papua New Guinea society. Schools, initially set up by the Anglican mission and now run by the government, have existed in the villages since 1902 and today almost all adults can communicate in at least basic English as well as Tok Pisin and their own Maisin language. A quarter or more of the population now lives in urban areas elsewhere in the country and their remittances form an essential part of the local economy. The Maisin are best known internationally for their exquisitely designed painted bark cloth (tapa cloth).

Recent problems and actions

During the 1990s, Maisin aligned themselves with a number of environmental non governmental organizations, most notably Greenpeace, in opposition to commercial logging in the rainforests behind their villages and to foster small scale, environmentally friendly, development. Their quixotic fight against a logging company, which had illegally claimed access to their lands, garnered a great deal of international attention up to 2002, when the Maisin defeated the company in a national court case. Despite this victory, the area continues to be eyed by logging and mining interests and the community is divided in their support or opposition to large scale 'development' projects in the region.

In November 2007, the Maisin villages along with much of Oro Province were hit by devastating floods that destroyed gardens and undermined many houses.

Notes

John Barker. Ancestral Lines: The Maisin of Papua New Guinea and the Fate of the Rainforest. Toronto: University of Toronto Press, 2016.

External links
 The Maisin Archives
 Maisin Christianity: An Ethnography of the Contemporary Religion of a Seaboard Melanesian People
 Missionaries, environmentalists, and the Maisin, Papua New Guinea
 Engendering Objects: Dynamics of Barkcloth and Gender among the Maisin of Papua New Guinea

Indigenous peoples of Melanesia
Ethnic groups in Papua New Guinea